C35 or C-35 may refer to:

Vehicles

Aircraft
 Beechcraft C35 Bonanza, an American civil utility aircraft
 Caspar C 35, a German biplane airliner
 Cessna C-35, an American military transport
 EKW C-35, a 1930s Swiss reconnaissance biplane
 Lockheed C-35 Electra, an American military transport

Automobiles 
 Citroën C35, a French van
 DFSK C35, a Chinese van
 Sauber C35, a Swiss Formula One car
 Nissan Laurel C35, a Japanese sedan

Locomotives 
 New South Wales C35 class locomotive, an Australian steam locomotive

Ships
 , a Town-class light cruiser of the Royal Navy
 , a C-class submarine of the Royal Navy

Other uses
 C-35 (cipher machine)
 C35 road (Namibia)
 Autovia C-35, a highway in Catalonia, Spain
 Caldwell 35, a supergiant elliptical galaxy
 King's Gambit, a chess opening
 Konica C35 AF, a Japanese film camera
 Piaggio Stella P.VII C.35, an Italian aircraft engine
 Reedsburg Municipal Airport, in Sauk County, Wisconsin